The North Wilkesboro Flashers were a minor league baseball team based in North Wilkesboro, North Carolina. From 1948 to 1950, the Flashers played exclusively as members of the Class D level Blue Ridge League, winning the 1949 league championship. North Wilkesboro hosted home minor league games at Memorial Park. The team nickname was in reference to their manager Harry Lohman, whose nickname was "Flash."

History
Minor league baseball was first hosted in North Wilkesboro, North Carolina in 1948, when the North Wilkesboro "Flashers" became as members of the six–team Class D level Blue Ridge League. The Galax Leafs, Leaksville-Draper-Spray Triplets, Mount Airy Graniteers, Radford Rockets and Wytheville Pioneers joined North Wilkesboro in beginning league play on May 1, 1948,.

The North Wilkesboro use of the "Flashers" moniker was in reference to player/manager Henry Lohman, who was nicknamed "Flash." Lohman would manage the team in each of the three seasons of play.

The Flashers placed 2nd in their first season of play and qualified for the playoffs. With a record of 72–54, playing under manager Henry Loman, North Wilkesboro finished 4.5 games behind the 1st place Galax Leafs in the regular season standings. North Wilkesboro lost in the 1st round of the playoffs as the Mount Airy Graniteers defeated North Wilkesboro 3 games to 1 in the playoff series.

Following the 1948 season, the North Wilkesboro Flashers sought public sources for funding. The North Wilkesboro franchise sold stock shared to the public. Two hundred shares were issued at $100.00 each by "The North Wilkesboro Baseball Club, Inc."

The North Wilkesboro Flashers won the 1949 Blue Ridge League championship. The 1949 North Wilkesboro Flashers ended the Blue Ridge League regular season in 4th place. The Flashers ended the regular season with a 62–62 record, finishing 5.0 games behind the 1st place Mt. Airy Graniteers, while playing under managers Tom Daddino, the returning Henry Loman and Bernie Keating. In the playoffs, the North Wilkesboro Flashers defeated the Galax Leafs 4 games to 2 to advance. In the Finals, North Wilkesboro won the championship by defeating the Wytheville Statesmen 4 games to 1.

In their final season, the 1950 North Wilkesboro Flashers placed last in the Blue Ridge League standings. As the league played with six teams in its final season, the Flashers ended the 1950 season with a record of 40–76, placing 6th in the Blue Ridge League regular season standings. Playing under managers Bernie Loman and Henry Loman, North Wilkesboro finished 44.0 games behind the 1st place Elkin Blanketeers in the final standings. The Blue Ridge League permanently folded after the 1950 season.

North Wilkesboro, North Carolina has not hosted another minor league franchise.

The ballpark
The North Wilkesboro Flashers were noted to have played minor league home games at  Memorial Park. The site today is reportedly called William K. Newton Memorial Park.

Timeline

Year–by–year records

Notable alumni
Paul Pryor (1948)

See also
North Wilkesboro Flashers players

References

External links
Baseball Reference

Defunct minor league baseball teams
Baseball teams established in 1948
Baseball teams disestablished in 1950
1948 establishments in North Carolina
Defunct baseball teams in North Carolina
Blue Ridge League teams
Wilkes County, North Carolina
1950 disestablishments in North Carolina